The idea of organizing the first international music competition in the Czech Republic emerged in 1946. It was proposed by the conductor Rafael Kubelík and members of the Czech Philharmonic Orchestra as a part of the Prague Spring International Music Festival. The first competition took place in May, 1947. In 1957, the Prague Spring International Music Competition became one of the founding members of the World Federation of International Music Competitions.

The city hosts competitions that cater to different ages such as the Concertino Praga which focuses on young musicians up to 16 years.  In addition to youth competitions the country hosts the International competition of blind & partially sighted performers and composers which is held in Prague for young blind and partially sighted artists.  Also, all types of music are celebrating by Prague from the Beethoven's Hradec International Music Competition to the František Gregor International Double Bass Competition which is held in one to four-year cycles in the Moravian town of Kroměříž.  Some of the competitions, such as the Antonín Dvořák International Vocal Competition Karlovy Vary, was formerly only open to artists from Socialist bloc. Since 1989, after the collapse of the Eastern communist states, the competition is open without restrictions.

One of the latest international music events to be founded in the country is the International Bohuslav Martinů Festival and Choir Competition which started in 1999.  As of 2009, Czech Republic hosts more than fifty international music competitions.

List of international music competitions in the Czech Republic

Bibliography 
Notes 

References

External links 
Festa Musicale - Choir Festivals
Prague Choral Meetings - Choir Festivals
Prague Advent Choral Meeting - Choir Festivals